Franciscan monastery of the Holy Spirit is a Bosnian Franciscan monastery in Fojnica, Bosnia and Herzegovina.

History 

It was founded in 1668 and it includes a library of ca. 12,500 volumes, including 13 incunabula and 156 works written in Bosnian Cyrillic.
It is a designated National Monument of Bosnia and Herzegovina.
It is part of the Franciscan Province of Bosna Srebrena.

The monastery's museum collections holds the 15th century Ahd-Namah (the Order) of Sultan Mehmed II the Conqueror guaranteeing security and freedom to the Franciscans. This document allowed the Franciscans of the day to preach freely among the Catholics in BiH, which in turn enabled the preservation of Bosnian Catholicism through the centuries.

The museum also houses the Book of Coats of Arms, dating from 1304—probably one of the oldest books in the region—with historical coats of arms of some Balkan countries and of then-prominent Bosnian families. A rare numismatic collection is also on exhibit.

Most of the works are philosophical and theological, printed from the 16th to the 19th centuries. The library's archive preserves more than 3,000 documents from the Ottoman Empire, with 13 of them dating back to 1481.

See also
 Franciscan Province of Bosna Srebrena

References

External links

 
 Fojnica – samostan i župa Svetoga Duha 

Fojnica
Christian monasteries established in the 17th century
Religious buildings and structures completed in 1668
1668 establishments in the Ottoman Empire